Ivan Kraljevic is a Montenegrin film director.

Early life
Kraljevic was born in Kotor, Montenegro on August 13, 1975. He is the son of a Croatian sea captain and Montenegrin banker. He was raised by his maternal great-grandmother, Stana, while both his parents worked. Kraljevic learned English and Italian by watching movies. In January 1992, at the age of sixteen, he moved to the United States as a high school exchange student.

Career
Kraljevic joined the Directors Guild of America in 1999. He has worked on over one hundred projects in various capacities and directed his first feature film "The Harvesting" in 2015.

Filmography
 Paper (2013): Won Best Drama - Short, Action on Film International Film Festival; Platinum Award for Independent Short Subject Film - Drama, Worldliest Houston; Juror's Choice Award for Best Social Commentary, Poppy Jasper film Festival; Short Film Award for Best Short Film, Moondance International Film Festival; Grand Jury Award for Best Romance Short, Bare Bones International Film Festival
 Shadows (2014): Nominated for Best Short Film and Best Cinematography, Action on Film International Film Festival
 The Harvesting (2015)
Infernal (2015)

References

External links
 
 http://www.jewishjournal.com/shiksa_in_hollywood/item/santa_monica_film_festival

1975 births
Living people
Yugoslav emigrants to the United States
American film directors
Montenegrin film directors
Montenegrin people of Croatian descent